The Jaywalker is a studio album by American pianist, composer and bandleader Duke Ellington featuring tracks recorded in 1966 and 1967 and released on the Storyville label in 2004.

Reception

The AllMusic review by Ken Dryden awarded the album 3½ stars and states "some tracks are obviously not as polished as his later (and better-known) studio or live recordings. But it is always fascinating to hear works in progress by Ellington... Serious collectors of Ellington will enjoy this compilation".

Track listing
All compositions by Duke Ellington, except as indicated
 "The Shepherd" - 6:29
 "Up Jump" - 3:06
 "Rue Bleu" - 3:02
 "Chromatic Love Affair" - 4:02
 "Salomé" (Raymond Fol) - 4:14
 "Blood Count" (Billy Strayhorn) - 3:50
 "El Viti" - 3:27
 "Kixx" - 3:55
 "Eggo" -5:37
 "I'm Hip Too" - 0:36
 "Amta" - 2:51
 "Warr" - 4:23
 "Little Purple Flower" - 4:32
 "Traffic Cop" - 3:50
 "Untitled Blues" - 4:52
 "Polícia" - 1:42
 "The B.O. of Traffic" - 0:43
 "Mac" - 2:37
 "Traffic Extension" - 5:37
 "Star" - 0:54
 "Cross Climax" - 0:27
 "B.O. Man" - 3:11
 "Tin Soldier" - 2:24
Recorded at RCA Studio in New York on March 29, 1966 (track 7), August 18, 1966 (track 23), March 23, 1967 (tracks 14-22), April 24, 1967 (tracks 8-13) and June 23, 1967 (tracks 1-6).

Personnel
Duke Ellington – piano
Cat Anderson, Mercer Ellington (tracks 1-7 & 23), Herb Jones, Cootie Williams - trumpet
Lawrence Brown, Buster Cooper - trombone
Chuck Connors - bass trombone
Russell Procope - alto saxophone, clarinet
Johnny Hodges - alto saxophone
Jimmy Hamilton - tenor saxophone, clarinet
Paul Gonsalves - tenor saxophone
Harry Carney - baritone saxophone, clarinet, bass clarinet
Jimmy Jones - piano (tracks 1-6)
John Lamb - bass
Chris Columbus (tracks 1-6), Bobby Durham (tracks 8-22), Sam Woodyard (tracks 7 & 23) - drums
Emanuel Abdul-Rahim - congas (tracks 8-22)

References

Storyville Records albums
Duke Ellington albums
2004 albums